Jean-Louis Masson may refer to:

 Jean-Louis Masson (politician, 1947)
 Jean-Louis Masson (politician, 1954)

Masson, Jean-Louise